Gareth Lodwig Wardell (born 29 November 1944) is a British Labour politician.  He was elected as Member of Parliament for Gower in a 1982 by-election, and held the seat until he stood down at the 1997 general election.

Background

Wardell was born on 29 November 1944. Wardell's father, Jack Wardell, was a barber from Carmarthenshire.

Before entering politics, Wardell lectured geography at Trinity College, Carmarthen.

Political career

Wardell entered the House of Commons as the Member of Parliament for Gower in 1982 following a by-election in the constituency.

In June 1983, Wardell was appointed chairman of the Welsh Affairs Committee. Wardell remained in this position until he retired as an MP in 1997.

Post-Parliamentary Career

Wardell works as a Public Affairs consultant in South Wales.

References

External links

1944 births
Living people
Welsh Labour Party MPs
UK MPs 1979–1983
UK MPs 1983–1987
UK MPs 1987–1992
UK MPs 1992–1997